Pass.ng is a self-testing online platform in Nigeria which allows users to practice for national exams through interactive modules. Founded in 2012 as Jamb-cbt.com, It won the airtel's Catapult-a-Startup, the AAI pitch-fest competition and the West Africa Mobile Awards (WAMAS) in 2016. It also got an endorsement from Joint Admissions and Matriculation Board in 2015.

Background
In an interview with Outliers Magazine, Samson Abioye said he got the idea for pass.ng after learning that over 70% of those who sit for national exams fail in Nigeria. He thereafter pitched the idea to his fellow undergraduates during their Industrial Training program with the ICT Unit of Ladoke Akintola University. He was joined by Abayomi Akanji, Imole Oluyemi and Joshua Adebagbo and they registered the new startup as Pass.ng. Abayomi went on to become the Head of mobile development and, Imole was the Product Design Lead, Joshua the Chief technology officer and Abioye Samson the Chief executive officer.

Business model
Pass.ng functions on a freemium pricing model. A limited amount of preparatory questions can be attempted for free, after which further usage requires loading a recharge card of the intended subscription price. During the initial stage, users had to go to the bank to pay the amount of their intended subscription (which most times is  very little). The process was said to be tedious, time wasting and reportedly drove a lot of intending paying subscribers away. A model of sending the recharge card of the intended subscription was also developed but also wasn't helpful either as the founders got loads of recharges without knowing what to do with them. They have since decided to work with some of Nigerians telecom agent on a model of allowing the user to recharge on their lines the amount they wish to subscribe which will be deducted by the telecoms themselves and a percentage paid to pass.

Awards and recognition

 Pass.ng has been endorsed by the exam conducting body - Joint Admissions and Matriculation Board in 2015.
 Pass.ng won the Airtel Catapult-a-Startup entrepreneurship development program. This included a cash prize of 1 million naira and promotion opportunity from Airtel. 
 Pass.ng is listed as a service on Airtel's website. 
 Pass.ng won the 2015 edition of the AAI pitch-fest competition.
 Pass.ng was among the 2016 winners of the West Africa Mobile Awards (WAMAS).

References 

Companies based in Lagos
Nigerian educational websites
Organizations established in 2012
2012 establishments in Nigeria